The Rufus Sita Tombstone (RIB 121) is the marker of the grave of Rufus Sita, a Roman soldier from the mid 1st Century AD, found near London Road, Gloucester, in 1824. The stone is approximately 4ft by 3ft in size.

The tombstone is of a type typically used for Roman soldiers, depicting a horseman spearing a foe on the ground with an epitaph below stating the age and service of the deceased, his origins and who placed the tombstone.

According to the tombstone, Rufus Sita was a horseman of the Sixth Cohort of Thracians, who died aged 40 after 22 years service. His heirs arranged to have the tombstone made in accordance with the wishes in his Will. The Sixth Cohort was one of the Roman military units stationed at Gloucester, or Glevum as it was then known.

The Latin inscription on the tombstone reads:
RVFVS · SITA · EQVES · CHO · VI
TRACVM · ANN · XL · STIP · XXII
HEREDES · EXS · TEST · F · CVRAVE
H. S. E. 
or:
Rufus Sita, eques Cohortis VI
Thracum, annorum XL, stipendiorum XXII.
Heredes ex testamento faciendum curaverunt.
Hic situs est.

Which translates as:
Rufus Sita, horseman of the Sixth Cohort of Thracians,
lived forty years and served twenty-two.
His heirs, in accordance to his will, had this erected.
He is laid here. 

The tombstone has been in the Gloucester City Museum & Art Gallery since 1873.

References

Further reading
Anderson, Alastair Scott. Roman Military Tombstones. Aylesbury: Shire Publications, 1984.

External links
Alternative picture of the Rufus Sita Tombstone.
Roman tombstones.

Roman archaeology
Archaeological artifacts
History of Gloucester